Geoffrey Bean Atkinson (29 January 1896 – 1 September 1951) was an English first-class cricketer.  Atkinson was a right-handed batsman who bowled right-arm fast-medium.  He was born in Lambeth, London.

Atkinson made two first-class appearances for Middlesex in 1930, making his debut against Yorkshire in the County Championship in June and playing against Leicestershire in July.  His other first-class appearance came in 1933 for HDG Leveson-Gower's XI against Oxford University. In his three first-class matches he scored 25 runs at a batting average of 6.25, with a high score of 14.  With the ball he took 2 wickets at a bowling average of 28.50, with best figures of 2/28 against Oxford University. He also played a number of non-notable matches for the Marylebone Cricket Club from 1928 to 1936.

He died in Bognor Regis, Sussex on 1 September 1951.

References

External links
Geoffrey Atkinson at ESPNcricinfo
Geoffrey Atkinson at CricketArchive

1896 births
1951 deaths
People from Lambeth
Cricketers from Greater London
English cricketers
Middlesex cricketers
H. D. G. Leveson Gower's XI cricketers